"Daisy Bell (Bicycle Built for Two)" is a song written in 1892 by British songwriter Harry Dacre with the well-known chorus "Daisy, Daisy / Give me your answer, do. / I'm half crazy / all for the love of you", ending with the words "a bicycle built for two". The song is said to have been inspired by Daisy Greville, Countess of Warwick, one of the many mistresses of King Edward VII. It is the earliest song sung using computer speech synthesis by the IBM 704 in 1961, a feat that was referenced in the film 2001: A Space Odyssey (1968). Also referenced in the movie Robots (2005) by Blue Sky Studios.

History
"Daisy Bell" was composed by Harry Dacre in 1892. As David Ewen writes in American Popular Songs:

The song was originally recorded and released by Dan W. Quinn in 1893.

In technology and culture

Computing and technology

 In 1961, an IBM 704 at Bell Labs was programmed to sing "Daisy Bell" in the earliest demonstration of computer speech synthesis. This recording has been included in the United States National Recording Registry. 
 In 1974, auditory researchers used the melody of "Daisy Bell" for the first demonstration of "pure dichotic" (two-ear only) perception: they encoded the melody in a stereophonic signal in such a way that it could be perceived when listening with both ears but not with either ear alone.
 In 1975, Steve Dompier, member of Homebrew Computer Club, programmed an Altair 8800 computer to play Daisy as AM radio interference.
 In 1985, Christopher C. Capon created a Commodore 64 program named "Sing Song Serenade", which caused the Commodore 1541 floppy disk drive to emit the tune of "Daisy Bell" directly from its hardware by rapidly moving the read/write head.
In 1999, a piece of computer software called BonziBuddy sang Daisy Bell if the user asked it to sing.
 Microsoft's personal assistant, Cortana, may sing the first line of Daisy when asked to sing a song.

Films
 Science-fiction author Arthur C. Clarke witnessed the IBM 704 demonstration during a trip to Bell Labs in 1962 and referred to it in the 1968 novel and film 2001: A Space Odyssey, in which the HAL 9000 computer sings "Daisy Bell" during its gradual deactivation.
 Oliver Reed sings the song "Daisy Bell" in the 1972 film The Triple Echo.
 In Revenge of the Nerds (1984), Takashi (Brian Tochi) sings a Japanese version of "Daisy Bell" during his tricycle race against the Alpha Betas.
 In Robots (2005), when Rodney fixes Bigweld during the slide scene, Bigweld sings "Daisy Bell", the first song sung by a computer.
 In The Time Traveler's Wife (2009), Alba and her father Henry sing the song "Daisy Bell" in an attempt to stop him from traveling through time while he is still using a wheelchair from a recent accident.

TV 

A student choir sings "Daisy Bell" (with minor lyric changes) at the beginning of a bicycle race in the Midsomer Murders Series 12 episode, "The Glitch" (2009).

American Horror Story. Season 8, Episode 10. (2018).  Ms Mead (recreated as an android by tech wizards Mutt and Jeff) explodes during the final confrontation between the Witches and Michael Langdon. Ms Mead’s severed head, sings “Daisy Bell” in a slurred and distorted voice.

Musical recordings
 Dan W. Quinn produced a wax cylinder recording of "Daisy Bell" in 1893, the first recorded rendition of the song.
 Singer Dinah Shore recorded a version of the song for Bluebird Records in 1941.
 Singer Nat King Cole produced the most well-known recording of "Daisy Bell" as part of his Those Lazy-Hazy-Crazy Days of Summer LP for Capitol Records in 1961.
 On May 3, 2014, an album was released composed entirely of covers of "Daisy Bell" entitled The Gay Nineties Old Tyme Music: Daisy Bell, in conjunction with Mark Ryden's exhibit "The Gay 90s". The album features covers of "Daisy Bell" by Katy Perry, Tyler, the Creator, "Weird Al" Yankovic, Nick Cave, Kirk Hammett of Metallica, Mark Mothersbaugh of Devo, Wall of Voodoo's Stan Ridgway, Danny Elfman, and others. Profits from the album went to the nonprofit Little Kids Rock.

Radio
 The tune was played as the lead-in to Aunt Daisy's radio broadcasts in New Zealand, which ran from 1930 until her death in 1963.

References

External links

 
 1894 recording of "Daisy Bell" (MP3)
 Page featuring a recording of "Daisy Bell" sung and played by IBM computers at Bell Laboratories in the early 1960s (see last track on side 2 labeled "Synthesized computer speech demonstration (1963)")

1892 songs
British songs
English children's songs
Songs about bicycles
Songs about marriage
Songs about socialites
Blur (band) songs
Katy Perry songs
Nick Cave songs
Tyler, the Creator songs
"Weird Al" Yankovic songs
Articles containing video clips